Benjamin Delacourt (born 10 September 1985) is a French footballer who plays for R.W.D. Molenbeek.

Career
Ahead of the 2019/20 season, Delacourt joined R.W.D. Molenbeek.

References

French footballers
Belgian Pro League players
1985 births
Living people
R.E. Mouscron players
Wasquehal Football players
Royal Excel Mouscron players
K.M.S.K. Deinze players
Cercle Brugge K.S.V. players
R.W.D. Molenbeek players
Association football defenders
People from Croix, Nord
Footballers from Hauts-de-France
Sportspeople from Nord (French department)
Expatriate footballers in Belgium
French expatriate sportspeople in Belgium
French expatriate footballers